Michèle Gavazzi (born January 19, 1973) is a Uruguayan-born Canadian writer of children's literature, living in the Outaouais region of Quebec.

Biography
Gavazzi was born on January 19, 1973, in Montevideo, Uruguay. A year later, her family moved to Italy, her father's country of origin, before moving again to the Canadian province of Quebec in 1976. She grew up there and, under the insistence of her parents, studied fundamental sciences at Cégep de l'Outaouais, then obtained a Bachelor of Arts in Modern Languages and Literature at the University of Ottawa in 1998. It was thanks to her children that she began to write in 2005, because she wanted to show them a different kind of romance.

Awards
In 2008, Gavazzi won the Prix Jeunesse des univers parallèles for her novel Nessy Names. The Curse of Tiens.

Bibliography
Nessy Names series
La Malédiction de Tiens (2006)
La Terre sans mal (2007)
Le Pachakuti (2007)

Eva, elfe des eaux series
L'Héritage d'Isabella (2008)
Le Plan de Ka'al (2008)
Le Fils de Gaëlle (2008)

Iris series
La Prophétie de la tisserande (2009)
Les Artisans de vie (2009)
La Prison du Chaos (2009)

Aria series
La Cigüe (2010)
Les Apôtres de Frank (2010)
Immortalité (2010)

References

1973 births
Living people
Writers from Montevideo
Canadian women children's writers
Canadian women novelists
Canadian novelists in French
Canadian people of Italian descent
Women science fiction and fantasy writers
Writers from Quebec
20th-century Canadian women writers
21st-century Canadian women writers
Uruguayan emigrants to Canada
Canadian children's writers in French